Fernando Lazcano Echaurren (born 23 July 1848–30 August 1920) was a Chilean politician and lawyer who served as President of the Senate of Chile.

External links
 BCN Profile

1848 births
1920 deaths
People from Santiago
Chilean people of Basque descent
Deputies of the XVII Legislative Period of the National Congress of Chile
Deputies of the XVIII Legislative Period of the National Congress of Chile
Deputies of the Constituent Congress of Chile (1891)
Presidents of the Senate of Chile
Senators of the XXIV Legislative Period of the National Congress of Chile
Senators of the XXV Legislative Period of the National Congress of Chile
Senators of the XXVI Legislative Period of the National Congress of Chile
Senators of the XXVII Legislative Period of the National Congress of Chile
Senators of the XXVIII Legislative Period of the National Congress of Chile
Senators of the XXIX Legislative Period of the National Congress of Chile
Senators of the XXX Legislative Period of the National Congress of Chile
Senators of the XXXI Legislative Period of the National Congress of Chile
Senators of the XXXII Legislative Period of the National Congress of Chile
University of Chile alumni